The Campaigners; Or, The Pleasant Adventures At Brussels is a 1698 comedy play by the English writer Thomas D'Urfey. It was first staged at the Theatre Royal, Drury Lane by Christopher Rich's Company.

The original Drury Lane cast included Thomas Simpson as Don Leon, Benjamin Johnson as The Sieur Bondevelt, John Mills as Colonel Darange, Tobias Thomas as Kinglove, William Pinkethman as Min Heer Tomas, Colley Cibber as Marqui Bertran, William Bullock as Mascarillo, Frances Maria Knight as Angellica, Susanna Verbruggen as Madam la Marquise, Mary Powell as  Anniky and Mary Kent as  Gusset.

References

Bibliography
 McVeagh, John. Thomas Durfey and Restoration Drama: The Work of a Forgotten Writer. Routledge, 2017.
 Van Lennep, W. The London Stage, 1660-1800: Volume One, 1660-1700. Southern Illinois University Press, 1960.

1698 plays
West End plays
Plays by Thomas d'Urfey
Restoration comedy